Augustana Vikings football may refer to:
 Augustana (Illinois) Vikings men's basketball, the college basketball team of Augustana College in Rock Island, Illinois
 Augustana (South Dakota) Vikings men's basketball, the college basketball team of Augustana University in Sioux Falls, South Dakota